The 2010 O'Byrne Cup was a Gaelic football competition played by the teams of Leinster GAA. The competition differs from the Leinster Senior Football Championship as it also features further education colleges and the winning team does not progress to another tournament at All-Ireland level. Last year's winners of the O'Byrne Cup were Louth. The O'Byrne Cup was due to begin on 6 January 2010; however, due to Arctic conditions in the Leinster region of Ireland, the Leinster council decided to postpone all games until 16 January.

2010 Rule changes
This competition was the first Leinster senior football competition to include the 2010 modifications to the rules of the game.  In matches in this competition, players could only use a fist pass rather than having the option of using an open-handed hand pass, which was the case previously.  An experimental 'mark' rule was also introduced, where a played catching a kick-out from the goalkeeper between the 45-metre lines was awarded a free kick.  There were also changes in the location where penalties and kickouts were taken, and the definition of what constituted a 'bounce' during solo runs.

O'Byrne Cup

First round
The eight winning teams from the first round of the O'Byrne Cup went on to qualify for the quarter finals of the tournament. The losers of the first round went on to the O'Byrne Shield quarter finals.

Quarter-finals
The quarter finals were played on the weekend of 24 January 2010.  One match (Dublin vs Meath) ended in a draw, and a replay was held on 27 January.  Another match (Laois vs Kildare) was a source of controversy, when a brawl which occurred during the match led to a total of seven players being sent off.  A subsequent investigation into the incident led to 4 Laois players and 2 Kildare players receiving suspensions from the game for between four and eight weeks. The affected players would be ineligible to play in the rest of the O'Byrne Cup, as well as any National Football League matches scheduled to be played during the period of suspension.

Semi-finals

Final

O'Byrne Shield
The O'Byrne Shield consists of the 8 losing teams from the first round of the O'Byrne Cup.

Quarter-finals

Semi-finals

Final

See also
 2010 Dr McKenna Cup

References

2010
2010 in Gaelic football
January 2010 sports events in Europe
February 2010 sports events in Europe